The 2018 Esiliiga B was the 6th season of the Esiliiga B, third-highest Estonian league for association football clubs, since its establishment in 2013.

Teams
Of the 10 participating teams 4 remained following the 2017 Esiliiga B. The 2017 champions Kalju U21, runners-up Kalev U21 and 4th placed Keila JK were promoted to Esiliiga, while 10th place Sillamäe Kalev U21 was relegated and Viimsi JK and Raasiku Joker decided not to participate in 2018 Esiliiga B. For this season those six teams will be replaced by 6 II Liiga teams. They are: Lasnamäe Ajax, Nõmme United, Pärnu JK, Tallinna Legion, Flora U19 and Võru Helios. Only Tallinna Legion and Flora U19 have played in Esiliiga B before.

Stadia

Personnel and kits

Managerial changes

Results

League table

Results tables

First half of the season

Second half of the season

Positions by round

Season statistics

Top scorers
Updated on 20 July.

Awards

Monthly awards

Esiliiga B Player of the Year
Rejal Alijev was named Esiliiga B Player of the Year.

See also
 2017–18 Estonian Cup
 2018–19 Estonian Cup
 2018 Meistriliiga
 2018 Esiliiga

References

External links
Official website

Esiliiga B seasons
3
Estonia
2018–19 in European third tier association football leagues